The 1958 Chicago Cubs season was the 87th season of the Chicago Cubs franchise, the 83rd in the National League and the 43rd at Wrigley Field. The Cubs finished fifth in the National League with a record of 72–82.

Offseason 
 October 8, 1957: Steve Bilko was purchased from the Cubs by the Cincinnati Redlegs.
 November 16, 1957: Casey Wise was traded by the Cubs to the Milwaukee Braves for Chick King, Ben Johnson, Leonard Williams (minors) and cash.
 December 2, 1957: Tony Taylor was drafted by the Cubs from the San Francisco Giants in the 1957 rule 5 draft.
 December 10, 1957: Tom Poholsky was traded by the Cubs to the San Francisco Giants for Freddy Rodríguez.

Regular season

Season standings

Record vs. opponents

Notable transactions 
 April 3, 1958: Bob Speake and cash were traded by the Cubs to the San Francisco Giants for Bobby Thomson.
 May 20, 1958: Jim Brosnan was traded by the Cubs to the St. Louis Cardinals for Alvin Dark.

Roster

Player stats

Batting

Starters by position 
Note: Pos = Position; G = Games played; AB = At bats; H = Hits; Avg. = Batting average; HR = Home runs; RBI = Runs batted in

Other batters 
Note: G = Games played; AB = At bats; H = Hits; Avg. = Batting average; HR = Home runs; RBI = Runs batted in

Pitching

Starting pitchers 
Note: G = Games pitched; IP = Innings pitched; W = Wins; L = Losses; ERA = Earned run average; SO = Strikeouts

Other pitchers 
Note: G = Games pitched; IP = Innings pitched; W = Wins; L = Losses; ERA = Earned run average; SO = Strikeouts

Relief pitchers 
Note: G = Games pitched; W = Wins; L = Losses; SV = Saves; ERA = Earned run average; SO = Strikeouts

Farm system

Notes

References 

1958 Chicago Cubs season at Baseball Reference

Chicago Cubs seasons
Chicago Cubs season
1958 in sports in Illinois